Krueppel-like factor 10 is a protein that in humans is encoded by the KLF10 gene.

See also
 Kruppel-like factors

References

Further reading

External links 
 

Transcription factors